The Velvet Horn  is a 1957 novel by American novelist Andrew Nelson Lytle. At the time of its publication, it was very well received both because of its ambitious scope, complex and dynamic style, mythical character and diversity of characters. Because of these characteristics, some critics compared the novel to James Joyce's Ulysses.

References 

1957 American novels